Nittel Nacht or Nittel is a name given to Christmas Eve by Jewish scholars in the 17th century, observed as early as the late 16th century by Rabbi Samuel Eidels.

Etymology
The Yiddish word "Nittel" for Christmas is likely derived from the medieval Latin name for Christmas, although it is also often associated with the Hebrew  ("the hanged one"), which was used in medieval times to refer to Jesus.

Customs
The most prominent custom commonly observed on Nittel Nacht is to abstain from Torah study, although historically some read the Toledot Yeshu instead. Staying up late and playing card games or chess were also popular. Some Jewish mystics believed apostates were conceived on the day and as a result forbade married couples from sexual relations on Nittel Nacht.

Origin
The first explicit reference to the practice of avoiding Torah study appears in Rabbi Yair Bacharach's Mekor Chaim, composed sometime between 1660 and 1692, where he wrote “and  there  is  a  custom  of  abstaining  from  study  on  the evening  of  that  man's  [i.e.,  Jesus']  holiday." The first allusion to the practice of staying up late playing games appears in a Jewish communal ordinance from 1708 and was later mentioned in the work of Moses Sofer. Another early written reference to the practice of abstaining from reading the Torah is in a 17th-century writing by Rabbi Yair Bacharach. In the Middle Ages in Christendom, Jews were often forbidden from appearing in public during the Christmas holidays, and Christmas Eve frequently marked the beginning of attacks on the Jewish population. Many Jews observed Nittel Nacht as a way to avoid leaving their homes, and to avoid giving the appearance of celebrating the Christian holiday. Many also sought to avoid experiencing any pleasure or joy on Christmas, to ensure that no glory would be given to the day.
Medieval apostates such as Johann Pfefferkorn, Julius Conrad Otto, Johann Adrian, and Samuel Friedrich Brenz wrote that the common belief among Jews at the time was that on Christmas Eve, Jesus would wander all the toilets of the world as a punishment for spreading false teachings. They wrote that Jews feared that if Jesus heard them reading the Torah, he would get a respite from his suffering, so they refrained from it. The apostates also wrote about Jews eating a lot of garlic on Christmas Eve to ward off the demon Jesus, as well as Jewish children being hesitant to use the latrine on Christmas Eve from the fear of Jesus reaching out and pulling them in.
The observance of Nittel Nacht was popularized by the Baal Shem Tov in the 18th century. After the advent of the Gregorian Calendar, Orthodox Christians and Catholic Christians observed Christmas Eve on two separate dates; this led to Rabbinic debate, and Nittel Nacht is observed in accordance with the local Christian community.

In modern times, with less tense Jewish-Christian relations, Nittel Nacht is less observed, although certain Hasidic communities still observe it, with many communities observing it according to the Julian Calendar rather than the Gregorian Calendar, and some communities observing both nights.

See also 

 Jews and Christmas

Notes

References

Christianity and Judaism
Christmas-linked holidays
December observances
Jewish observances